Chevy Chase Elementary School is an elementary school containing grades 3–5 in Chevy Chase, Maryland. Founded in 1917, the school today occupies a much-renovated and -expanded 1930 building that has been designated as an Historic Site by the Maryland Historical Trust. The school is also said to have had the first school library in the county, established in 1939.

History 
The early 1900s brought educated government workers to developing areas of Montgomery County such as Silver Spring, Bethesda, and Chevy Chase.  A two-room schoolhouse on Bradley Lane in Chevy Chase served residents from 1898 until 1917, when a permanent school building was constructed.  In that year, a two-story brick building was built on Rosemary Street by a contractor named Roy W. Poole of Frederick, Maryland, at a cost of $20,000 in county funds. It was for many years was known informally as the "Rosemary School" after its location on Rosemary Street. 

In 1930, a 12-classroom brick building designed by Howard Wright Cutler was added to the Chevy Chase School for $94,000.  

In 1936, nine classrooms were added for $103,000 to the west wing. With this addition, the original 1917 structure was demolished. To connect the new buildings, a “Long Hall” was added. This “Long Hall” connected the two buildings to each other, but only from the first floor. This hall did not contain any insulation and was known to be unstable.

The school is also said to have had the first school library in the county, established in 1939.

By the early 1970s, the school buildings were aging and out of date, necessitating extensive renovation and expansion.  The process took two summers and a school year (during which time students were ferried to other nearby schools) and was completed in time for the 1975–76 school year.  The renovated and expanded building provided more classrooms, a bigger library, and a courtyard in the middle.

The Chevy Chase Historical Society described how the school grew from 1917 through year 2000 renovations and summarizes that the "new state-of-the-art Chevy Chase Elementary School is distinguished in its architectural interior and exterior detailing.  The design of the building is coherent and compatible with the original school, while preserving its unique location in the heart of the community."

Chevy Chase Elementary was awarded a National Blue Ribbon for excellence during the 1993–1994 school year.  In 2017, the school celebrated its 100th anniversary.

Described as "an early example of school architecture that successfully combines both traditional and modern design elements", with "Art Deco geometric panels and stepped-up parapets [that] were modern for the era, yet ... tempered by classical door and window treatments", the school has been designated as an Historic Site by the Maryland Historical Trust.

See also
 Town of Chevy Chase

References

External links
 
 "Chevy Chase Elementary", from the collection of the Chevy Chase Historical Society

1917 establishments in Maryland
Chevy Chase (town), Maryland
Educational institutions established in 1917
Historic sites in Maryland
Public elementary schools in Maryland
School buildings completed in 1930
School buildings completed in 1936
School buildings completed in 1975